Pietro Bonaventura (died 1653) was a Roman Catholic prelate who served as Bishop of Cesena (1629–1653).

Biography
On 14 March 1629, Pietro Bonaventura was appointed during the papacy of Pope Urban VIII as Bishop of Cesena.
On 17 April 1629, he was consecrated bishop by Antonio Marcello Barberini, Cardinal-Priest of Sant'Onofrio, serving as co-consecrators. 
He served as Bishop of Cesena until his death on 23 July 1653.

References

External links and additional sources
 (for Chronology of Bishops) 
 (for Chronology of Bishops) 

17th-century Italian Roman Catholic bishops
Bishops appointed by Pope Urban VIII
1653 deaths